Debbie E. Regala (born April 27, 1945) is an American politician who served as a member of the Washington State Legislature from 1995 to 2013.

Early life and education 
Regala was born in Tacoma, Washington. She earned a Bachelor of Arts degree in education and foreign languages from the University of Puget Sound in 1968.

Career 
Regala has served as a member of the Washington House of Representatives from 1995 to 2000. She served in the Washington State Senate from 2001 to 2013. In 2003, she was appointed Assistant Democratic Floor Leader and in 2005, she was elected Majority Whip.

Personal life 
Regala lives in Tacoma, Washington. She and her husband have three children.

References

1945 births
21st-century American women politicians
2000 United States presidential electors
Living people
Democratic Party members of the Washington House of Representatives
People from Tacoma, Washington
Democratic Party Washington (state) state senators
Women state legislators in Washington (state)
University of Puget Sound alumni